Mazra-e Keymas (also Romanized as Mazrā’-e Keymās; also known as Mazra‘eh Keymās) is a village in Pishkuh-e Mugui Rural District, in the Central District of Fereydunshahr County, Isfahan Province, Iran. At the 2006 census, its population was 108, in 22 families.

References 

Populated places in Fereydunshahr County